Ermenegildo is the Italian form of the given name Hermenegild. It may refer to:
 Ermenegildo Agazzi (1866–1945), Italian painter
 Ermenegildo Arena (1921–2005), Italian water polo player and swimmer
 Ermenegildo Costantini (1731–1791), Italian painter
 Ermenegildo Florit (1901–1985), Italian Roman Catholic cardinal
 Ermenegildo Gasperoni (1906–1994), Sammarinese politician
 Ermenegildo Luppi (1877–1937), Italian sculptor
 Ermenegildo Pellegrinetti (1876–1943), Italian Cardinal of the Roman Catholic Church
 Ermenegildo Pini (1739–1825), Italian clergyman, naturalist, mathematician, geologist and philosopher
 Ermenegildo Pistelli (1862–1927), Italian papyrologist and palaeographer
 Ermenegildo Zegna Group, an Italian luxury fashion house
 Ermenegildo Zegna (fashion entrepreneur) (born 1955), its current chairman
 Giuseppe Antonio Ermenegildo Prisco (1833–1923), Italian Cardinal of the Roman Catholic Church

See also
 Hermenengildo Gildo Mahones (1929–2018), American jazz pianist

Italian masculine given names